Walter Ashburner (1864 – February 1936) was an America-born British classical and legal scholar. He was Professor of Jurisprudence at the University of Oxford from 1926 to 1929.

References 

1864 births
1936 deaths
American expatriates in the United Kingdom
Professors of Jurisprudence (University of Oxford)
People educated at University College School
Alumni of Balliol College, Oxford
Fellows of Merton College, Oxford
Members of Lincoln's Inn
Fellows of University College, Oxford
American expatriates in Italy